Coca-Cola Amatil Limited (CCA) was an Australian bottler of non-alcoholic beverages that existed from 1904 to 2021, when it merged with Coca-Cola European Partners to form Coca-Cola Europacific Partners. It was one of the largest bottlers of non-alcoholic ready-to-drink beverages in the Asia-Pacific region and one of the world's five major Coca-Cola bottlers. CCA operated in six countries—Australia, New Zealand, Indonesia, Papua New Guinea, Fiji and Samoa. The company also bottled beer and coffee.

Products
CCA's diversified portfolio of products included carbonated soft drinks, spring water, sports drinks and energy drinks, fruit juices, iced tea, flavoured milk, coffee, tea and alcohol. Coca-Cola Amatil distributed a number of sparkling, still and other non-alcoholic beverages. Some of these include:

Water
 Mount Franklin Water
 Pump
 Neverfail
 Peats Ridge Pure
 AdeS (Indonesia)
 Aquarius Water
 Kiwi Blue (New Zealand)
 Pure Drop (New Zealand)
 Nature's Own Water (Papua New Guinea)

Non-alcoholic beverages
 Coca-Cola
 Diet Coke
 Coca-Cola Vanilla
 Leed
 Sprite
 Sprite Zero
 Fanta
 Lift
 Lemon & Paeroa
 Deep Spring
 Mother
 Kirks
 Bisleri
 Glaceau Vitamin Water
 Powerade
 e2
 Nestea
 Australian Bitters Company
 Goulburn Valley
 Grinders Coffee
 Lemon & Paeroa
 Lift plus
 Kiwi Blue
 Keri Juice
 Rose's Cordial Lemon
 Fuze Tea
 Barista Bros

Alcoholic beverages
Maker's Mark
Jim Beam
Knob Creek
Booker's
Basil Hayden's
Vox
Vodka O
Canadian Club
Old Crow
Kilbeggan Distillery
Sauza Tequila
Laphroaig distillery
Galliano
Bols
Pressman's Cider
Australian Beer Co Alehouse
Arvo
Coors Brewers
vonu
Fiji Bitter
Blue Moon
Samuel Adams
Bounty Rum

Beer & cider
Blue Moon
Coors
Feral Brewing Company
Magners
Miller Brewing Company
Pressman's Apple Cider
Rekorderlig
Vailima
Yenda Brewing Company

Hot beverages
Grinders Coffee 
Romanza coffee
FIX Coffee

Countries served
As at December 2014, Coca-Cola Amatil employed 14,700 people in six countries across the Asia-Pacific region.

The company is the bottler of Coca-Cola products in Australia, New Zealand, Indonesia, Papua New Guinea, Fiji and Samoa.

Ownership
Coca-Cola Amatil was listed on the Australian Securities Exchange; however, The Coca-Cola Company has a 30.8% shareholding in Coca-Cola Amatil, as it does with each of its primary or "anchor" bottlers in the worldwide Coca-Cola system. At the same time, Coca-Cola Amatil is joint owner with The Coca-Cola Company of Coca-Cola Bottling Indonesia (CCBI).

History
The company's Australian origins date back to 1904 as the tobacco company British Tobacco (Australia). Its first foray into soft drinks came in 1964 with the purchase of Coca-Cola Bottlers (Perth), and the company was listed on the Australian Stock Exchange in 1972.

Soft drinks and snack foods gradually became the primary focus of the company, and was renamed Allied Manufacturing and Trade Industries Limited in 1973 and Amatil Limited in 1977. It began to expand bottling operations overseas in Europe, purchasing a Coca-Cola bottling plant in Australia in 1982 and expanding into Fiji and New Zealand in 1987. A majority stake was purchased by The Coca-Cola Company in 1989, although today its ownership is 29%. In 1989, the company sold its WD & HO Wills tobacco division to British American Tobacco.

The snack food operations were sold in 1992, and European operations were spun off into a new company, Coca-Cola Beverages, in 1998. Expansion into Asia continued, though Filipino bottling was eventually sold to San Miguel Brewery and parent The Coca-Cola Company.

Coca-Cola Amatil's group managing director is Alison Watkins, and the board chairman is Ilana Atlas.

CCA has facilities all over Australia, with key sites at Northmead (NSW), North Sydney (NSW), Richlands (QLD), Moorabbin (VIC) and Hazelmere (WA). CCA announced on 22 February 2017 that it would be closing the Thebarton site on Port Road early in 2019 as there was no space to expand it, and expanding the Richlands site in Queensland.

From 2006 to 2011, CCA had a joint venture (named Pacific Beverages) with SABMiller to distribute its drinks in Australia. In 2011, SABMiller acquired Foster's Group and full ownership of Pacific Beverages; in exchange, Foster's sold its Fiji and Samoa operations to Coca-Cola Amatil in 2012.

In May 2021, CCA was acquired by Coca-Cola European Partners for A$9.8 billion, forming the new largest Coca-Cola bottling firm Coca-Cola Europacific Partners.

Container deposit schemes
Coca-Cola Amatil opposed proposals for Northern Territory and Western Australian container deposit schemes between 2011 and 2013. Former West Australian treasurer Delia Lawrie claimed that Coca-Cola offered to fund her political opponents (the Country Liberal Party), to oppose a container deposit scheme, a claim the company strongly denied.

In 2013, Coca-Cola Amatil joined with Schweppes and Lion in a legal challenge against the Northern Territory Government's 'Cash for Containers' recycling scheme arguing it breached Australia's Mutual Recognition Act 1992. This Act creates a legal requirement that "goods produced in or imported into the first State, that may lawfully be sold in that State... (may) be sold in the second State." Beverage companies argued that the recently introduced Cash for Containers scheme, which doubled recycling rates to 30% in the Northern Territory in the limited time it operated, hindered this right by requiring the company to implement different production processes for the same product in different states and territories. The Federal Court ruled in favour of the beverage companies. The ruling created a public backlash with hostile posts on Coca-Cola's Facebook page and calls for a boycott.

Coca-Cola Amatil argued that the Cash for Containers scheme was ineffective and costly suggesting a "National Bin Network" as an alternative solution. The Council of Australian Governments found the economic cost of a national container deposit scheme would be between $1.4 and $1.76 billion; however, research undertaken by the Boomerang Alliance in 2008 suggested that such a scheme would in fact bring about saving of up to $84 million. Organisations such as Keep Australia Beautiful and the Boomerang Alliance supported the initiative as an addition to Cash for Containers, but argued that if used alone it would make a comparatively insignificant difference to recycling rates.

Former Northern Territory Chief Minister, Terry Mills, stated that he would continue to fight against Coca-Cola for Cash for Containers and called on other States and Territories to support the Scheme.

See also
 Swire Coca-Cola – Hong Kong-based bottler, with investment in bottling business in China

References

External links
 

Drink companies of Australia
Coca-Cola bottlers
Manufacturing companies based in Sydney
Food and drink companies established in 1904
Australian companies established in 1904
Companies formerly listed on the Australian Securities Exchange
2021 mergers and acquisitions